Jack Bush is an American football coach. He currently serves as the outside linebackers coach and special teams coordinator at Mississippi Valley State University in Itta Bena, Mississippi. Bush served as the head football coach at Central State University in Wilberforce, Ohio in 1996 and Lincoln University in Jefferson City, Missouri from to 2000 to 2001.

Head coaching record

College

References

Year of birth missing (living people)
Living people
Alabama State Hornets football coaches
Avila Eagles football coaches
Bowling Green Falcons football coaches
Central State Marauders football coaches
Jackson State Tigers football coaches
Johnson C. Smith Golden Bulls football coaches
Lincoln Blue Tigers football coaches
Mississippi Valley State Delta Devils football coaches
New England Patriots scouts
Tuskegee Golden Tigers football coaches
High school football coaches in Maryland
High school football coaches in Missouri
Lincoln University (Missouri) alumni
African-American coaches of American football
21st-century African-American people